Almost all of Uruguay has a humid subtropical climate (Cfa according to the Köppen climate classification). It is fairly uniform nationwide, since the country is located entirely within the temperate zone. Seasonal variations do exist, but extremes in temperature are rare. As would be expected by its abundance of water, high humidity and fog are common. The absence of mountains and other weather barriers makes all locations vulnerable to high winds and rapid changes in weather as fronts or storms sweep across the country. Weather is sometimes humid.

The country is expected to get hotter and wetter with climate change, with some parts of the country becoming more tropical, with more extreme rain events.

Temperature and rainfall
Seasons are fairly well defined, and in most of Uruguay spring is usually damp, cool, and windy; summers are warm; autumns are mild; and winters are chilly and uncomfortably damp. Northwestern Uruguay, however, is farther from large bodies of water and therefore has warmer summers and milder and drier winters than the rest of the country.

Rainfall is fairly evenly distributed throughout the year, and annual amounts increase from southeast to northwest. Montevideo averages  annually, and Artigas receives  in an average year. As in most temperate climates, rainfall results from the passage of cold fronts in winter, falling in overcast drizzly spells, and summer thunderstorms are frequent.

Climate data

Winds
High winds are a disagreeable characteristic of the weather, particularly during the winter and spring, and wind shifts are sudden and pronounced. A winter warm spell can be abruptly broken by a strong pampero, a chilly and occasionally violent wind blowing north from the Argentine pampas. Summer winds off the ocean, however, have the salutary effect of tempering warm daytime temperatures.

Occasionally, damaging extratropical cyclones occur: 
 In 2005, a heavy storm affected southern Uruguay with winds of up to 200 km/h.
 In 2012, another similar storm swept the southern coasts with winds of up to 172 km/h.

Climate change

Institutions
The Uruguayan National Directorate of Meteorology is the leading institution in climatological matters. Since 1951 Uruguay is member of the World Meteorological Organization.

As a consequence of the 4th General Meeting of Global Environment Facility in 2010, there will be an observatory specialized in climate change in Uruguay - a new experience on a world scale.

References

External links 
 National Directorate of Meteorology (in Spanish)

 
Uruguay